"Chase the Sun" is a song by Italian electronic music group Planet Funk with vocals from Finnish singer Auli Kokko. The melody is taken from Ennio Morricone's tune "Alla luce del giorno" from the score of the 1969 film Metti, una sera a cena ("). The song was released across Europe in 2000 and 2001 as the lead single from Planet Funk's debut studio album, Non Zero Sumness (2002). "Chase the Sun" peaked at number five in the United Kingdom and additionally reached the top five in Greece, Romania, and Spain.

Track listings

Italian CD single
 "Chase the Sun" (extended club mix) – 7:42
 "Chase the Sun" (instrumental mix) – 8:00
 "Chase the Sun" (radio edit) – 3:47

UK and Australian CD single, UK cassette single
 "Chase the Sun" (radio edit) – 3:36
 "Chase the Sun" (extended club mix) – 7:42
 "Chase the Sun" (instrumental) – 8:00

UK 12-inch single
A1. "Chase the Sun" (extended club mix) – 7:42
B1. "Chase the Sun" (instrumental) – 8:00
B2. "Chase the Sun" (instrument-aopella) – 3:47

French CD single
 "Chase the Sun" (radio edit) – 3:42
 "Chase the Sun" (extended club mix) – 7:57

Credits and personnel
Credits are taken from the UK CD single liner notes.

Studio
 Recorded in May 2000 at Souled Out! Studios (Naples, Italy)

Personnel

 Marco Baroni – writing, keys
 Domenico "GG" Canu – writing, guitar, keys
 Sergio Della Monica – writing, guitar, keys
 Simon Duffy – writing, engineering, programming
 Alex Neri – writing, keys

 Auli Kokko – vocals
 Alessandro Sommella – guitar
 Andrea Cozzani – bass
 Planet Funk – production, mixing

Charts

Weekly charts

Year-end charts

Certifications

Release history

Usage
The song was used by CBBC in early 2001 for its continuity links.

The song is also used by Sky Sports for their coverage of darts in the UK. The song is played in the auditorium during the advert breaks of Sky-owned tournaments and it has developed a cult following amongst darts fans, who tend to rave and chant during the breaks.

See also
 List of number-one club tracks of 2001 (Australia)

References

2001 debut singles
2001 songs
Virgin Records singles